Thaskara Lahala is a 2010 Indian Malayalam-language comedy film directed by Ramesh Das, starring Suraj Venjaramood. This is the director's second film after Thattakam and his second collaboration with Suraj Venjaramood in the lead role. It co-stars Lakshmi Sharma, who plays the role of a police officer.

Cast

References

External links 
 
 https://web.archive.org/web/20120606144010/http://popcorn.oneindia.in/title/8243/thaskara-lahala.html
 sify.com

2010s Malayalam-language films
2010 films